Network is the sixteenth studio album by Canadian rock band Saga, released in the fall of 2004. A two-disc version was released on November 8, 2005, comprising the original CD and a DVD containing a 5.1 mix of the original album. It is the only Saga album to feature drummer Christian Simpson, who had replaced original drummer Steve Negus.

Concept
Network appears to be a partial concept album about television; the opening number is entitled "On the Air", and it features songs like "Keep It Reel" and "Live at Five", which make references to television programming. In addition, the cover artwork features a television set depicting five earlier Saga covers on the screen (the debut album prominently in the middle, Images at Twilight top left, Silent Knight bottom right, Full Circle bottom left and House of Cards top right). On the back cover, the song titles were prefaced with "Channel 1", "Channel 2", "Channel 3" and so on, recalling the Chapters series that had closed with the previous album, Marathon.

Track listing

Credits
Saga
Michael Sadler – vocals
Jim Crichton – bass
Ian Crichton – guitar
Jim Gilmour – keyboards, vocals
Christian Simpson – drums

Production
Produced by Jim Crichton
Engineered by Jim Crichton
Mixed by Jim Crichton assisted by Michael Sadler
Recorded and Mixed at Sound Image Studios, Van Nuys, California
Additional recording done at:
Dangling Carrot Studios, Brantford, Ontario, Canada
Good Sheppard Studios, Toronto, Ontario, Canada
Canyon Studios, Malibu Canyon, California, USA
Mastered by Brian Foraker, Autumnwood Mastering, Nashville, TN
Cover Concept by Jim Crichton
Cover Design by Penny Crichton for Imagestockaid

Charts

References

Saga (band) albums
2004 albums
SPV/Steamhammer albums
Inside Out Music albums
Concept albums